Bulgaria and Indonesia established diplomatic relations in 1956. Bulgaria has an embassy in Jakarta while Indonesia has an embassy in Sofia.

History
Bulgaria recognized Indonesia's independence on September 21, 1956, and diplomatic relations were established on the same day. Bulgaria has had an embassy in Jakarta since October 1958 and Indonesia has had an embassy in Sofia since 1960.

Agreements

In June 2003, the two countries signed a memorandum of understanding on trade.

In September 2003, Bulgaria and Indonesia's respective presidents pledged agreement on combating international terrorism.

In 2004, the Bulgarian news agency, BTA, set up a cooperative relationship with Indonesia's ANTARA. In 2005, Bulgaria sent USD 82,000 worth of medicine to Indonesia after the tsunami of December 26, 2004. Also in 2004, Bulgarian Foreign Minister Solomon Passy talked to Noer Hasan Wirajuda, Indonesia's Foreign Minister, and they agreed that Bulgaria and Indonesia should boost their bilateral cooperation.

Humanitarian aid
Following the 2006 Yogyakarta earthquake in Indonesia, Bulgaria sent humanitarian aid of 160,000 leva for the victims of the earthquake. Disaster Management Minister Emel Etem said that the country would donate medicine, 50 tents and mattresses, 1,500 blankets.

See also 
 Foreign relations of Bulgaria
 Foreign relations of Indonesia
 List of diplomatic missions of Bulgaria
 List of diplomatic missions of Indonesia

References

External links 
 Bulgarian embassy in Jakarta
 Indonesian embassy in Sofia

 
Indonesia 
Bilateral relations of Indonesia